Sir Arthur Fairfax Charles Coryndon Luxmoore (27 February 1876 — 25 September 1944) was a British barrister and judge who sat as a Lord Justice of Appeal

Life
Luxmoore was born on 27 February 1876 to Arthur Coryndon Hansler Luxmoore, an artist, and his wife Katherine. After studying at The King's School, Canterbury he matriculated to Jesus College, Cambridge, which he represented in rugby and cricket. Called to the Bar by Lincoln's Inn in 1899, he took a place in the chambers of George Cave after graduation in 1900. 

After playing for the England national rugby union team against both Scotland and Wales he threw himself into his work as a barrister, and built up a successful practice. In 1919, he applied to become a King's Counsel, and was accepted. He became a Bencher of Lincoln's Inn in 1922, and in February 1929 was knighted and made a judge of the Chancery Division of the High Court of Justice.

A well-respected and hard working judge, Luxmoore was promoted to the Court of Appeal of England and Wales in October 1938 and made a Privy Councillor. Although not normally delivering the leading judgment, his secondary judgments and dissenting judgments proved valuable, and dissenting judgments were several times upheld by the House of Lords.

In 1943, he was made Treasurer of Lincoln's Inn, but in March was taken ill suffering from overwork. He returned to the Bench, but suffered a heart attack on 25 September 1944 and died.

References

1876 births
1944 deaths
Alumni of Jesus College, Cambridge
Cambridge University R.U.F.C. players
Chancery Division judges
England international rugby union players
English rugby union players
Knights Bachelor
Lords Justices of Appeal
Members of Lincoln's Inn
Members of the Judicial Committee of the Privy Council
Members of the Privy Council of the United Kingdom
People educated at The King's School, Canterbury
Rugby union players from Kilburn, London
Kent County RFU players